Bruce Littlefield is an American author, businessman, actor, model, and TV contributor. He is the regarded as an American "lifestyle authority".  He has been called a "Modern Day Erma Bombeck", a  "Garage Sale Guru", the "Flea Market King" and is featured as a "design and lifestyle guru" on Howdini.com.

He is the author of numerous books, including an Americana series with HarperCollins, Use What You've Got with Barbara Corcoran, My Two Moms with Zach Wahls, and The Sell with Fredrik Eklund. He appears on television, having made notable TV lifestyle segments on Today Show, Early Show, and The View. He has also ghostwritten and/or co-written several books.

Education and career 
Littlefield was born in South Carolina and graduated in 1985 from Brookland-Cayce High School in Cayce, South Carolina. He went to the University of South Carolina where he wrote for The Daily Gamecock newspaper, and graduated in 1989 with a degree in broadcast journalism and membership in Phi Beta Kappa.)

After graduation, Littlefield moved to New York City and worked as a model and an actor until being awarded scholarships by the Freedom Forum and Mortar Board to do graduate studies. He obtained his MA in journalism from NYU's School of Journalism in 1995.

Littlefield has appeared on The Rachael Ray Show and has been featured in The New York Times, The Boston Globe, the New York Post, People Magazine, the National Enquirer, OK! Magazine, Saveur, This Old House, the New York Daily News, Miami Herald, The Boston Herald, Chicago Tribune, and the Los Angeles Times.

In 2002, with partner Scott Stewart, a senior vice president at the Corcoran Group, he opened the Rosendale Cement Company restaurant in Rosendale, New York, and then in 2005 opened a second restaurant, The Alamo: Mexican Food Worth Fighting For.

In 2010, Littlefield was a holiday spokesperson for TJ Maxx and Marshalls.

Bibliography 
 Airstream Living (2005) 
 Garage Sale America (2007) 
 Merry Christmas America (2007) 
 The Bedtime Book for Dogs (2011) 
 Moving In: Tales of an Unlicensed Marriage (2013)

Collaborations 
 (with Barbara Corcoran) Use What You've Got and Other Business Lessons I Learned from My Mom (2003) 
 (with Zach Wahls) My Two Moms: Lessons of Love, Strength, and What Makes a Family with Zach Wahls (2012) 
 (with Lis Wiehl) Lis Wiehl's Truth Advantage: The 7 Keys to a Happy and Fulfilling Life (2012) 
 (with Fredrik Eklund) The Sell: The Secrets of Selling Anything to Anyone

References 

Living people
20th-century American businesspeople
21st-century American businesspeople
Male actors from New York City
Male models from New York (state)
American restaurateurs
Businesspeople from New York City
New York University alumni
People from Lexington County, South Carolina
People from Richland County, South Carolina
Spokespersons
University of South Carolina alumni
Writers from New York City
Writers from South Carolina
Year of birth missing (living people)